The Ludwig Mond Award is run annually by the Royal Society of Chemistry. The award is presented for outstanding research in any aspect of inorganic chemistry. The winner receives a monetary prize of £2000, in addition to a medal and a certificate, and completes a UK lecture tour. The winner is chosen by the Dalton Division Awards Committee.

Award History
The award was established in 1981 to commemorate the life and work of the chemist Dr Ludwig Mond and followed an endowment from ICI (Imperial Chemical Industries). Mond was born in Kassel, Germany in 1839, and became a noted chemist and industrialist who eventually took British nationality.

Recipients

Source:

See also

 List of chemistry awards

References

Awards of the Royal Society of Chemistry
Awards established in 1891